Triveni Express (15075) is an express train (also known as the "Queen of Sonbhadra") in India that runs from Shaktinagar/Singrauli (Sonbhadra) to Tanakpur via Chopan, Mirzapur, Vindhyachal, Allahabad, Lucknow and Shahjahanpur. It is categorized under the Mail/Express category of Indian Railways.

The name "Triveni" signifies the Triveni Sangam (the meeting pointing of three rivers) of the Ganges, the Yamuna and the (invisible) Saraswati at Prayag (Allahabad), a station on the train's route.

At first, the train ran from Lucknow to Allahabad. Later the train route was extended to Bareily via Sandila, Hardoi and Shahjahanpur.
From 27 February 2019, it will run up to Tanakpur (Uttarakhand).
A Triveni Link Express split from Triveni Express at Chopan and run to Barwadih via Daltonganj, Garhwa, Nagar Untari, Duddhinagar and Renukut.

The train employs a diesel locomotive WDM-3A (Prabal) of Lucknow Shed. In the early days, it used a diesel locomotive from Shaktinagar/Singrauli to Chunar Jn (CAR) on the UP journey and an electric locomotive from Allahabad Jn. to Chunar on the Down route.

At Chunar Junction (where Chopan-Chunar single track amalgamates Howrah-New Delhi double electrified track), the diesel locomotive was attached to the down track (for journey to Shaktinagar/Singrauli) and the electric locomotive was attached to the up track (for journey to Allahabad). The train ran exclusively by diesel from Allahabad to Lucknow.

Triveni Express completes its  track in approximately 19 hours and 15 minutes, making 32 stops.

Basically, It is the Lifeline of rural people. It connects various places of Sonbhadra. Most of the  population relies on it.

See also 

 Singrauli railway station
 Bareilly Junction railway station
 Shaktinagar Terminal - Bareilly Triveni Express

Trains from Bareilly
Named passenger trains of India
Rail transport in Madhya Pradesh
Express trains in India